is a mechanical designer in the Japanese anime industry. Okawara was the first in the industry to be specifically credited as a mechanical designer. He designed mecha for the Gundam and Brave Series franchises, as well as those of numerous Super Robot and Real Robot shows.

He was born and currently lives in Inagi, Tokyo, where he works out of a studio in his home.

Biography

Formative years
Okawara attended Tokyo Zokei University as a student in its graphic design department, moving to its textile design department one year later. Following graduation, he had been assigned by his school to a position as a fashion designer at the apparel company Onward Kashiyama Co. Ltd., where he also drew display backgrounds for their specialty store. Through the experience of drawing background art, he was led to take an art position at the animation company Tatsunoko Production; there, he (on suggestion from art director Mitsuki Nakamura) was assigned to design the enemy mecha for Science Ninja Team Gatchaman—soon devoting his time to that brand of design almost exclusively thereafter during Tatsunoko's production of Hurricane Polymar and Tekkaman: The Space Knight. This would prompt Nakamura to found the internal Tatsunoko "Design Office Mechaman" with Okawara (which later spun off from Tatsunoko), where Okawara would receive the first ever recorded industry credit of "mechanical designer." Ultimately, he would go on to design of the title mecha of the show Gowappā 5 Godam, hitting his stride at the company.

With Sunrise
Following the first two Time Bokan series in 1978, Okawara would leave Tatsunoko Production as an employee, striking out on his own as an independent contractor for "mechanical design." In addition to handling occasional design contracts from his old employer, he became a fixture at the studio Nippon Sunrise (one half of the studio that would later become Sunrise, Inc.). His first assignment from the studio would be principal mechanical design on the Super Robot show Invincible Steel Man Daitarn 3, directed by Yoshiyuki Tomino. Tomino would soon ask Okawara to continue to work with him on a new robot-oriented television project that he had tentatively named "Gunboy." In a then unheard-of move, Tomino instructed Okawara to design more "realistic," practically-designed title mecha for the series, closer to lines of the Mobile Infantry Powered Suits described in the Robert A. Heinlein novel Starship Troopers, rather than the fanciful iron giants depicted since the airing of Mazinger Z. The result would be Mobile Suit Gundam: a show which would cause a model kit boom in Japan and spark a new interest in mecha design, as well as originate the entire Real Robot genre prevalent among televised anime in the 1980s.

Following Mobile Suit Gundam, Okawara would continue to design mecha for later entries in the emerging Gundam franchise as well as many later Real Robot shows emerging from Sunrise. Notable in the 1980s alone were his works on Combat Mecha Xabungle, Fang of the Sun Dougram, Armored Trooper VOTOMS, Galactic Drifter Vifam and Blue Comet SPT Layzner. The late 1980s and early 1990s would soon see him joined by other mechanical designers working on various entries in the Gundam franchise such as Kazumi Fujita, Yutaka Izubuchi, Mamoru Nagano, Mika Akitaka, Makoto Kobayashi and Hajime Katoki, all of whom would provide their own "take" on Okawara's original work. Okawara himself would take note, their designs in turn inspiring him to expand the scope of his own.

In the early 1990s, many of Okawara's designs made an unexpected turn back toward those of classic Super Robots with Brave Exkaiser, the first show in Sunrise's Brave Series funded by Transformers manufacturer Takara. As the series of shows continued, Okawara would go on to design the principal robot for every entry in the Brave Series, culminating in his design of almost every robot seen in The King of Braves GaoGaiGar—the series' final televised entry—as well as the show's OVA sequel, The King of Braves GaoGaiGar FINAL.

In 2004, Okawara's fame as a mecha designer led him to be contracted by the 21st Century Museum of Contemporary Art in Kanazawa (Ishikawa) to design a type of head-mounted display used in the museum's "SYS*O17" electronic exhibit, created by Mathieu Briand. While describing the exhibit to museum management, Briand had referred to the subtle shape of Gundam's mecha when describing the displays he had intended to use; this in turn had led to the museum bringing Okawara into the project.

Current projects
Today, Okawara continues to design various title mecha in the Gundam franchise, most recently those related to Mobile Suit Gundam Unicorn.

History of works
(Listed chronologically)

Science Ninja Team Gatchaman (1972-1974)
Artist (enemy mechanical design)
Hurricane Polymer (1974)
Mechanical design (Tatsunoko Mechaman Design Office)
Tekkaman: The Space Knight (1975)
Mechanical design (Tatsunoko Mechaman Design Office)
Gowappā 5 Godam (1976)
Primary mechanical design (Tatsunoko Mechaman Design Office)
Time Bokan (1976)
Blocker Gundan IV: Machine Blaster (1976)
Yattāman (1977)
Mechander Robo (1977)
Chōgattai Majutsu Robo Ginguiser (1977)
Tobidase! Machine Hiryū (1977)
Gekisō! Ruben Gaizer (1977)
Invincible Steel Man Daitarn 3 (1978)
Principal mechanical design
Selected works: Daitarn 3
Uchū Majin Daikengō (1978)
Science Ninja Team Gatchaman II (1978)
Mobile Suit Gundam (1979)
Principal mechanical design
Selected works: Gundam (mobile suit), MS-06 Zaku II
Zendaman (1979)
The Ultraman (1979)
Science Ninja Team Gatchaman F (1979)
Invincible Robo Trider G7 (1980)
Time Patrol Tai Otasukeman (1980)
Tondemo Senshi Muteking (1980)
Fang of the Sun Dougram (1981)
Yattodetaman (1981)
Saikyō Robo Daiōja (1981)
Doraemon: The Record of Nobita: Spaceblazer (1981)
Kaitei Taisensō (1981)
Combat Mecha Xabungle (1982)
Gyakuten Ippatsu-man (1982)
Armored Trooper Votoms (1983)
Principal mechanical design
Selected works: ATM-09-ST Scopedog
Round Vernian Vifam (1983)
Mirai Keisatsu Urashiman (1983)
"Mobile Suit Variations" model kit line (1983)
Principal mechanical design
Panzer World Galient (1984)
Chōriki Robo Galatt (1984)
MS-X manga series (cancelled) (1984)
Principal mechanical design
Blue Comet SPT Layzner (1985)
Mobile Suit Zeta Gundam (1985)
Mechanical design
Selected works: Gundam Mk-II
Mobile Suit Gundam ZZ (1986)
Metal Armor Dragonar (1987)
Armor Hunter Mellowlink (1988)
Mashin Eiyuuden Wataru (1988)
Mado King Granzort (1989)
Mobile Suit Gundam 0080: War in the Pocket (1989)
Mobile Suit Gundam F90 model kit series (1990)
Principal mechanical design
Brave Exkaiser (1990)
Mechanical design
Selected works: Exkaiser, King Exkaiser, Dragon Kaiser, Great Exkaiser
The Brave Fighter of Sun Fighbird (1991)
Mechanical design
Selected works: Fighbird, Busou Gattai Fighbird, Granbird
Mobile Suit Gundam F91 (1991)
Mechanical design
Selected works: F91 Gundam Formula 91
Mobile Suit Gundam 0083: Stardust Memory (1991)
The Brave Fighter of Legend Da-Garn (1992)
Mechanical design
Selected works: Da-Garn, Da-Garn X, Great Da-Garn GX
Hero Senki: Project Olympus (1992)
The Brave Express Might Gaine (1993)
Mechanical design
Selected works: Might Gaine, Great Might Gaine, Might Gunner, Great Might Gaine Perfect Mode
Mobile Suit Victory Gundam (1993)
Mechanical design
Shippū! Iron Leaguer (1993)
Brave Police J-Decker (1994)
Mechanical design
Selected works: Deckerd, J-Decker, Fire J-Decker
Mobile Fighter G Gundam (1994)
Mechanical design
Selected works: GF13-017NJ Shining Gundam, GF13-017NJII God Gundam
The Brave of Gold Goldran (1995)
Mechanical design
Selected works: Goldran, Great Goldran
Mobile Suit Gundam Wing (1995)
Mechanical design
Selected works: XXXG-01W Wing Gundam, XXXG-00W0 Wing Gundam Zero
Brave Command Dagwon (1996)
Mechanical design 
Selected works: Fire Dag won, Super Fire Dagwon
Mobile Suit Gundam: The 08th MS Team (1996)
Mechanical design
Selected works: RX-79[G] Gundam Mass Production Ground Type
After War Gundam X (1996)
Mechanical design
Selected works: GX-9900 Gundam X
Gundam Wing: Endless Waltz (1997)
"Original Mechanical Designer" (actual mecha redesigned by Hajime Katoki)
The King of Braves GaoGaiGar (1997)
Principal mechanical design
Selected works: GaoGaiGar
Turn A Gundam (1999)
Mechanical design
Betterman (1999)
Sunrise Eiyūtan (1999)
The King of Braves GaoGaiGar Final (2000)
Principal mechanical design
Selected works: GaoFighGar, Genesic GaoGaiGar
Time Bokan 2000: Kaitō Kiramekiman (2000)
Gravion (2002)
Mobile Suit Gundam SEED (2002)
Mechanical design
Selected works: GAT-X105 Strike Gundam
Kikō Busō G-Breaker (2002)
Mobile Suit Gundam SEED X Astray (2003)
Mechanical design
Selected works: YMF-X000A Dreadnought Gundam, CAT1-X Hyperion Gundam
Mobile Suit Gundam SEED Destiny (2004)
Mechanical design
Selected works: ZGMF-X56S Impulse Gundam
Super Robot Wars GC (2004)
"Original Mechanical Designer"
"SYS*017" exhibit at 21st Century Museum of Contemporary Art, Kanazawa, Ishikawa (2004)
Head-mounted display and control trigger design
Mobile Suit Zeta Gundam A New Translation: Heirs to the Stars (2005)
Mobile Suit Zeta Gundam A New Translation II: Lovers (2005)
Mobile Suit Zeta Gundam A New Translation III: Love is the Pulse of the Stars (2006)
Mobile Suit Gundam SEED C.E. 73: Stargazer (2006)
Kishin Taisen Gigantic Formula (2007)
Guest mechanical design
Selected work: Chronos Zero
Another Century's Episode 3: The Final (2007)
Mechanical design of Falugen Custom, variation unit from Metal Armor DragonarMobile Suit Gundam 00 (2007)
Mechanical design of GN-000 0 Gundam and othersMobile Suit Gundam Unicorn (2010)
Original mechanical design (most of the actual mecha designs, including those for the eponymous mobile suit, were done by Hajime Katoki)
 World of Tanks Blitz (2016)
 Guest mechanical design, O-47When asked what the favorite of his works was during an interview, Okawara chose his designs for Shippū! Iron Leaguer''.

References

Further reading
Interview with Kunio Okawara  in Nikkei Monozukuri, October 2010

External links

 
 
 

1947 births
Living people
Tatsunoko Production people
People from Inagi, Tokyo
Mechanical designers (mecha)
Brave series
Tokyo Zokei University alumni